3rd Root was an American metal band from San Diego, California, United States.

History
3rd Root formed in 1996. Over the years, the band had some lineup changes, but ultimately settled on, Vocalist Chili Fields, Bassist Chris Baumgardener, Guitarist Andres Torres, and Drummer Daniel Barragan. The band got signed to Solid State Records, a subsidiary of Tooth & Nail Records. The band played shows with bands such as Dogwood, Living Sacrifice, Noise Ratchet and Coal Chamber. The band released the EP Spirit of Life in 2000, at the beginning at the year. The band released an album a few months later via Solid State, titled A Sign of Things to Come

Discography
Studio albums
A Sign of Things to Come (2000)

EPs
Spirit of Life (2000)

References

External links
 Powell, Mark Allan. (2002). "3rd Root" - The Encyclopedia of Contemporary Christian Music. Retrieved on July 6, 2017.

American Christian metal musical groups
Musical groups established in 1996
Musical groups disestablished in 2000
Solid State Records artists
Nu metal musical groups from California
Musical groups from San Diego
Hardcore punk groups from California
Christian rock groups from California
American alternative metal musical groups